Maurice (died 1107) was the third Lord Chancellor and Lord Keeper of England, as well as Bishop of London.

Life

Maurice was Archdeacon of Le Mans before being named Chancellor in about 1078. He held the office until sometime between 1085 or 1086. He was nominated to the see of London on 25 December 1085 and consecrated in 1086, possibly on 5 April. He died on 26 September 1107 with his death being commemorated on 26 September.

In 1087, after a widespread fire, Maurice  began rebuilding St Paul's Cathedral, possibly separate from the Anglo-Saxon church. In 1109 the cathedral was used for the consecration of the new archbishop of York, but it was probably not finished until about 1190. It was then one of the largest buildings in medieval England.

Citations

References

 
 

Lord chancellors of England
Year of birth missing
1107 deaths
Bishops of London
11th-century English Roman Catholic bishops
12th-century English Roman Catholic bishops